Theon of Antioch (Ancient Greek: Θέων, romanized: Theōn) was an ancient Greek Stoic philosopher during 1st century CE. He was from Antioch in Cilicia (modern Turkey).

Little is known about Theon. He is mentioned in Suda as a Stoic who wrote Socrates' defense speech, although he must have lived significantly after Socrates and Plato.

References 

Roman-era Stoic philosophers